Montacute Conservation Park is a protected area located in South Australia about   north-east of the Adelaide city centre.  The conservation park is classified as an IUCN Category III protected area.

References

Conservation parks of South Australia
Protected areas established in 1971
1971 establishments in Australia